Richard Greene (born July 17, 1961) is a Canadian poet. His book Boxing the Compass won the Governor General's Award for English language poetry at the 2010 Governor General's Awards.

A resident of Toronto, Ontario, Greene teaches English literature at the University of Toronto.

He is the author of Edith Sitwell: Avant Garde Poet, English Genius. Virago (2012)and most recently (2020) The Unquiet Englishman: A Life of Graham Greene.

References

1961 births
Canadian male poets
21st-century Canadian poets
Academic staff of the University of Toronto
Living people
Writers from St. John's, Newfoundland and Labrador
Writers from Ontario
People from Cobourg
Governor General's Award-winning poets
20th-century Canadian poets
20th-century Canadian male writers
21st-century Canadian male writers